The Christian Gospels of Mark and Matthew say that, after the Ascension of Jesus, his Apostles "went out and preached everywhere". This is described in Mark 16 verses 19 and 20, and Matthew 28 verses 19 and 20. According to a tradition mentioned by Eusebius, they dispersed to distinct parts of the world. In the Middle Ages a liturgical feast of the Dispersion of the Apostles was celebrated to commemorate their missionary work and their founding the apostolic sees. This annual feast was held on 15 July and ranked as a major double.

The Acts of the Apostles, the canonical sequel to the Gospel of Luke, portrays the dispersal as occurring a substantial time after the ascension, with the ministry staying in Jerusalem at first and spreading from there beginning with the conversion of the Ethiopian eunuch.

The dispersion of the Apostles
According to Book 3 of the Church History of Eusebius:

Arthur Cushman McGiffert comments:

Baronius considered that the occasion for this dispersion of the Apostles was the killing of James, son of Zebedee and the departure of Peter "to another place", a view rejected by Friedrich Spanheim.

Liturgical feast 
The first vestige of the liturgical feast of the Dispersion of the Apostles appears in the undoubtedly authentic sequence composed for it by a certain Godescalc (d. 1098) while a monk of Limburg on the Haardt; he also introduced this feast at Aachen, when provost of the Church of Our Lady. Godescalc was a follower of Henry IV and it is probable that he introduced this feast in the Church of Our Lady as a means of propaganda against Pope Gregory VII, with whom Henry stood in direct rivalry during the Investiture Controversy.

The feast is next mentioned by William Durandus, Bishop of Mende (Rationale Div. Off. 7.15) in the second half of the 13th century. Under the title, "Dimissio", "Dispersio", or "Divisio Apostolorum" it was celebrated during the Middle Ages in France, Spain, Italy, the Low Countries and also at least in the north of Germany. It is also mentioned in the "Order of Service for the Monastery of St. Gall" dating from 1583 as feast "duplex minus". The object of the feast (so Godescalcus) was to commemorate the departure (dispersion) of the Apostles from Jerusalem to various parts of the world, perhaps some fourteen years after the Ascension of Jesus, presumably following the Great Commission (Matthew 28:18-20). According to Durandus, some of his contemporaries honoured on this feast of the "Divisio Apostolorum" the (apocryphal) division of the relics (bodies) of St. Peter and St. Paul by St. Sylvester.

In 1909, according to the article by Frederick Holweck published in that year in volume 5 of the Catholic Encyclopedia, the feast was still kept with solemnity by some missionary societies, in Germany and Poland, also in some English and French dioceses and in the United States by the ecclesiastical provinces of St. Louis, Chicago, Milwaukee, Dubuque, and Santa Fé.

The feast was not included in the Tridentine Calendar or in any later revision of the General Roman Calendar. 

The proper Office for this feast is relegated to the "Pro Aliquibus Locis" or "For Other Places." The feast is celebrated in some places on July 15, titled "The Division of the Apostles" with a rank of Double. The rubric is taken from the Common Office, except the proper Nocturns for Matins, and the following Prayer that is recited throughout that day: O GOD, Who hast been pleased to bring us to know Thy Name by the means of Thy blessed Apostles, grant us the grace to honor their everlasting glory by our own progress and by the same honoring also to progress. Through our Lord.

See also
Early centers of Christianity

References

Catholic holy days
Christian terminology
July observances